Aviation in the European Union and the European Free Trade Association is regulated by the European Union Aviation Safety Agency (EASA). EASA specifies common standards for the licensing of aircraft pilots. EASA does not issue licences, rather licences are issued by member states. However, because the same standards are used, EASA licences are recognised by all member states.

Flight Crew Licensing is regulated by the document EU Part-FCL.

Licences

The most basic licence is the Light Aircraft Pilot Licence (LAPL). Separate licences are issued for aeroplanes, helicopters, sailplanes and balloons. This is not a standard ICAO licence.

Private Pilot Licences are issued for aeroplanes (PPL(A)) and helicopters (PPL(H)). The SPL is issued for sailplanes (gliders) and the BPL for balloons.

A Commercial Pilot Licence (CPL) allows a pilot to fly for remuneration.

An Airline Transport Pilot Licence (ATPL) allows a pilot to fly for air transport operations. It requires fourteen theoretical exams with a mandatory ground-school course.

Ratings

Instrument ratings

An Instrument Rating permits a pilot to fly in Instrument Meteorological Conditions (IMC). The competency-based instrument rating is obtained with a reduced training course, but it cannot be used on high-performance aircraft. The en-route instrument rating permits the pilot to fly in IMC only during the en-route phase of the flight, not during take-off or landing.

An EASA instrument rating can only be issued after acclimatisation flying in EU airspace and a skill test in EU airspace.

Night rating

A Night Rating permits a pilot to fly at night.

See also
Pilot licensing and certification

References

External links

Aviation licenses and certifications